Balti

Pakistani New Zealanders, also known as Pakistani Kiwis, are New Zealanders of Pakistani descent or Pakistan-born people who have immigrated to New Zealand.

Demographics
According to 2001 statistics, Pakistani Kiwis size around a population of 3,000. However, since that time, the population of Pakistani Kiwis has been growing at a fair pace across many parts of the country with significant figures in Auckland. In 2007, the population had grown to 5,000.
Pakistanis are located in almost all the major cities and towns of New Zealand, including Auckland, Hamilton, Wellington, Christchurch, Tauranga, Otago and Dunedin.

Religion

Most of the Pakistani New Zealanders are Muslims.

Notable people

Azhar Abbas - Auckland Aces cricketer
Haroon - English-born Pakistani pop singer of New Zealand origin
Billy Ibadulla - New Zealand-based former Pakistani cricketer and commentator

See also

 Punjabi New Zealanders
 New Zealand–Pakistan relations

References

External links
Cultural organisations
Pakistan Association of New Zealand
Pakistani Association of Canterbury New Zealand, in Christchurch and Canterbury region
Pakistan Association of New Zealand, based in Auckland
Pakistani Students Association at Massey University, New Zealand - organisation for students at all campuses of Massey University

Asian New Zealander